Vexillum interruptum is a species of small sea snail, marine gastropod mollusk in the family Costellariidae, the ribbed miters.

Description

Distribution
This species occurs in the South Pacific Ocean off the Society Islands.

References

External links
 Reeve, L. A. (1844-1845). Monograph of the genus Mitra. In: Conchologia Iconica, or, illustrations of the shells of molluscous animals, vol. 2, pl. 1-39 and unpaginated text. L. Reeve & Co., London
 Pease, W. H. (1868 ["1867"). Descriptions of marine Gasteropodæ, inhabiting Polynesia. American Journal of Conchology. 3(3): 211-222]

interruptum
Gastropods described in 1838